The 34th Golden Horse Awards (Mandarin:第34屆金馬獎) took place on December 13, 1997 at Sun Yat-sen Memorial Hall in Taipei, Taiwan.

References

34th
1997 film awards
1997 in Taiwan